Shineh-ye Olya (also Romanized as Shīneh-ye ‘Olyā) is a village in Qalayi Rural District, Firuzabad District, Selseleh County, Lorestan Province, Iran. At the 2006 census, its population was 177, in 36 families.

References 

Towns and villages in Selseleh County